
Gmina Masłów is a rural gmina (administrative district) in Kielce County, Świętokrzyskie Voivodeship, in south-central Poland.

Villages
Gmina Masłów contains the villages and settlements of Ameliówka, Barcza, Brzezinki, Ciekoty, Dąbrowa, Dolina Marczakowa, Domaszowice, Mąchocice Kapitulne, Mąchocice-Scholasteria, Masłów, Masłów Drugi, Wiśniówka and Wola Kopcowa.

Neighbouring gminas
Gmina Masłów is bordered by the city of Kielce and by the gminas of Bodzentyn, Górno, Łączna, Miedziana Góra and Zagnańsk.

References
Polish official population figures 2006

Maslow
Kielce County